Hutton is an unincorporated community and census-designated place (CDP) in Garrett County, Maryland, United States. Variant names for Hutton include Huttons Switch Station and Kindness.

The population was 86 at the 2010 census, which was up from a population of 29 recorded in the 2000 census.

Hutton is located on Maryland Route 39 adjacent to the West Virginia border. MD 39 leads east  to Oakland, the Garrett County seat, and West Virginia Route 7 leads northwest from the state line  to Terra Alta, West Virginia.

The community is in the valley of Snowy Creek, a southeast-flowing tributary of the Youghiogheny River.

Demographics

References

Census-designated places in Garrett County, Maryland
Census-designated places in Maryland